Banteay Neang is a commune (khum) of Mongkol Borey District in Banteay Meanchey Province in northwestern Cambodia.

Villages

Banteay Neang
Ou Thum
Phnum
Kouk Pnov
Trang
Pongro
Kouk Tonloab
Trabaek
Khile
Samraong Pen
Dang Run Lech
Dang Run Kaeut
Ou Snguot
Prey Changha Lech
Prey Changha Kaeut
Ou Andoung Lech
Ou Andoung Kandal
Ou Andoung Kaeut
Kouk Kduoch

Banteay Neang Market

References

Communes of Banteay Meanchey province
Mongkol Borey District